The China Art Museum, also called the China Art Palace (Shanghainese: Zongwu Nyizeh Ghon) or its original name, Shanghai Art Museum, is a museum of modern Chinese art located in Pudong, Shanghai. The museum is housed in the former China Pavilion of Expo 2010. It is one of the largest art museums in Asia.

History

The predecessor of the China Art Museum was the Shanghai Art Museum, which was established in 1956 in a former restaurant on West Nanjing Road, and completely rebuilt in 1986. On 18 March 2000, the Shanghai Art Museum was moved to the former Shanghai Race Club building on the People's Square, which had housed the Shanghai Library until 1997. With the move its exhibition space increased from 2,200 to 5,800 square meters.

Shanghai hosted Expo 2010 from 1 May to 31 October 2010, and the China Pavilion received close to 17 million visitors. Due to its popularity, the China Pavilion was reopened for six extra months after the end of the Shanghai Expo. On 13 November 2011, the Shanghai Municipal Government announced that the China Pavilion of Expo 2010 would become the new home of the Shanghai Art Museum and be renamed to China Art Museum, while the Urban Future pavilion would be converted to the Power Station of Art, a museum for contemporary art.

The China Art Museum and the Power Station of Art both opened on 1 October 2012, China's National Day. The old Shanghai Art Museum remained open until 31 December 2012, receiving more than 12,000 visitors in the last two days. The China Art Museum, covering 64,000 sq. meters, is more than ten times bigger than its predecessor.

Architecture

Construction for the China Pavilion of the Shanghai Expo began on 28 December 2007, and the building was completed on 8 February 2010. It was the most expensive pavilion at the Expo, costing an estimated US$220 million. The 63-metre high pavilion, the tallest structure at the Expo, is dubbed "the Crown of the East" due to its resemblance to an ancient crown. The building was designed by a team led by architect He Jingtang, who were inspired by the Chinese corbel bracket called dougong as well as the ancient bronze cauldron called ding.

Exhibitions

The China Art Museum has a collection of about 14,000 artworks, mainly of Chinese modern art.

Origin of Chinese modern and contemporary art
"The Bright Moon Rises from the Sea – Origin of the Chinese Modern and Contemporary Art" (海上生明月—中国近现代美术之源) is a permanent exhibition that chronicles the development of contemporary and modern Chinese art, starting with the Shanghai School at the end of the Qing Dynasty. It is divided into three periods (Qing, the Republic of China, and the People's Republic of China) and ten units, covering two floors with more than 6,000 works of art. The exhibition is curated by Lu Fusheng (卢辅圣).

Exhibition for noted painters
The Exhibition for Noted Painters (名家艺术陈列专馆) is a permanent exhibition that showcases works by some of the most famous modern Chinese artists. The first phase features the works of seven artists: He Tianjian, Xie Zhiliu, and Cheng Shifa from the Shanghai School; Lin Fengmian, Guan Liang, and Wu Guanzhong who pioneered the blending of Chinese and Western art styles; and Hua Tianyou, a founder of modern Chinese sculpture.

Art featuring the history and culture of Shanghai
This exhibition showcases artworks created for a government project that encourages artworks featuring Shanghai's historical and cultural development. The themes include people, historical events, folk customs, and architecture. The project lasted three years from 2010 to 2013.

21st century Chinese art
"The Picturesque China – Developing Chinese Fine Art in the New Century" (锦绣中华—行进中的新世纪中国美术) was a year-long exhibition that features 21st-century artworks created by more than 260 Chinese artists. It was divided into five units. The exhibition ended on 30 September 2013.

Special exhibitions
The museum frequently hosts special themed exhibitions. In its first year of operation it hosted more than a dozen special exhibitions including Taiwanese art, the second Shanghai Photography Exhibition, and Gustave Courbet and Jean-François Millet from the collection of the Musée d'Orsay of Paris.

Gallery

Visiting
The museum is located at 205 Shangnan Road in Pudong, Shanghai. It has its own station, the China Art Museum Station, on Shanghai Metro Line 8. It is also accessible via Yaohua Road Station on Line 7 and Line 8, and more than a dozen bus lines.

Admissions are free except for special exhibitions, which cost 20 yuan. The museum is closed on Mondays except for national holidays. In the first year of its operation, China Art Museum received nearly 2 million visitors.

References

External links
 

2012 establishments in China
Art museums established in 2012
Art museums and galleries in China
Museums in Shanghai
Pudong
World's fair architecture in China